The Sir Herbert Thompson Professor of Egyptology represents the chair of Egyptology at the University of Cambridge, England.

Stephen Glanville, 1946–1956
Jack Plumley, 1957–1977
John Ray, 2005–2013

Notes

Egyptology, Thompson, Sir Herbert
Faculty of Human, Social, and Political Science, University of Cambridge
Egyptology, Thompson, Sir Herbert